The Communication Workers Union (CWU) is a trade union representing ICT and postal workers in South Africa.

The union was founded in May 1996, when the Post and Telecommunication Workers' Association (POTWA) merged with two small staff associations: the Post Office Employees' Association, and the South African Post Telecommunication Employees' Association.  Like POTWA, the union affiliated to the Congress of South African Trade Unions.  While the leaders of POTWA were expected to win election to the leadership of the merged union, instead a rival slate of POTWA members won the initial elections, led by president Tlhalefang Sekano.

General Secretaries
 2003: Seleboho Kiti
 2006: Macvicar Dyasopu (acting)
 2007: Gallant Roberts 
 2012: Thabo Mokgalane (acting) 
 2014: Aubrey Tshabalala 
 2018: Aubrey Tshabalala (current)

References

Trade unions based in Johannesburg
Congress of South African Trade Unions
Communications trade unions
Trade unions established in 1996
Trade unions in South Africa